CBD Architects, also known as Chicago Building Design, P.C., is an American commercial architecture firm specializing in hospitality design. Founded in Chicago (1998), CBD has diversified to offices in Miami and New Orleans, with licensed architects in nine states: Colorado, Florida, Illinois, Indiana, Louisiana, Mississippi, Montana, New York, Texas, Washington, and Wisconsin.

History
The firm was founded by Jeremiah Johnson in 1998 and incorporated as Chicago Building Design, P.C. in 2000. It adopted the name, CBD Architects, to reflects its growth to designs in Miami, New Orleans, and New York.

CBD Architects specializes in commercial architecture's hospitality design market. Other firm services include permits, renovations, occupancy drawings, public right of way, and building code violation assistance.

Designs
Notable designs include:
 STK Chicago of The ONE Group (forthcoming) — River North, Chicago
 Pomp & Circumstance (2015) by Hubbard Inn owners — Old Town, Chicago
 Bangers & Lace (2015) — Evanston
 Gino's East (2014) — River North and South Loop, Chicago
 Celeste (2014) — River North, Chicago
 Siena Tavern (2013) — River North, Chicago
 Stout Barrel House & Galley (2012) — River North, Chicago
 The Boarding House (2012) — River North, Chicago
 Public House (2011) — River North, Chicago
 Hubbard Inn (2010) — River North, Chicago

References

External links
 

Architecture firms based in Chicago
Design companies established in 1998
1998 establishments in Illinois
American companies established in 1998